The Turi or Torai are a tribe of the Pashtun people, inhabiting the Kurram Valley, in Kurram Agency in the Federally Administered Tribal Areas of Pakistan, with a smaller number living across the Durand line in the Paktia province of Afghanistan. They speak Pashto and are adherents of the Twelver Shia sect of Islam. Unlike the majority of Pashtun tribes, The Turis predominantly follow the Shia sect of Islam, because of this and other reasons and land history they are usually tensions between them and the Sunni Pashtun tribes; Orakzai and Bangash tribe who also live in Kurram Valley.

History
The Turis came into prominence by the end of the 15th century. They used to wander in nomadic fashion between Aryob Valley of Paktia and Kurram Valley. They would migrate in the winter, cross the Kurram Valley which was then inhabited by the Bangash, and travel as far as the Indus River. The Turis appear to have migrated annually during the hot weather back to the Kurram Valley. They then took parts of Kurram of the Bangash tribe by force and now inhabit Upper Kurram. Today Bangash tribe can still be found living there in subjection to the Turi tribe 

The Mughal Emperor Babur mentions the Turis in Kurram in his diary of 1506.

In the 18th century, the Turi and their cousin tribe Zazai came into quarrel with the Bangash of the Kurram Valley which was then part of Durrani Empire (Kurram came under the British Raj after the Second Anglo-Afghan War of 1879–80). The Turis succeeded to capture the Paywar Pass, Shalozan and Malana, pushed the Bangash of the area southeastwards towards the Miranzai Valley, and eventually the Turis settled in the upper Kurram Valley.

British Indian annexation of Kohat
After the annexation of Kohat to British India, the Turis, in league with other clans, repeatedly harassed the Miranzai border, attacking the Bangash and Khattak villages in Kohat. In 1854 they made a treaty, but their raids continued, though punitive measures were not resorted to, as the tribe was held to be under the control of the Amir of Afghanistan.

However their raids increased in audacity, and in 1856 a force under Brigadier-General Neville Bowles Chamberlain entered the valley. Following this, compensation (the payment of which was guaranteed by the governor Ghulam Jan) was exacted, the Turis agreeing to pay 8,630 rupees. In 1859 the Turis joined the British expedition against the Kabul Khel Wazirs, but their feud with that tribe subsequently gave much trouble, with reprisals being undertaken by Wazirs in British territory for Turi offenses. In 1816, serious disturbances arose between the Bangash of Lower Kurram and the British village of Thal out of a boundary dispute. In 1877 the Turis were discontented with the oppressive administration of Shahbaz Khan, governor of Kurram, and when the Amir demanded from them a contribution of 50,000 rupees (a poll tax of 5 rupees on every adult female) and 6,000 recruits for his war against the British, they revolted and fled to the hills.

Attempts to pacify the tribe were unsuccessful for a time, but the Turis at last agreed to send a Jirga (Tribal council) to Kabul and pay a benefaction of 25,000 rupees, while Shahbaz Khan was recalled by the Amir.

In November 1878, a column under General Roberts entered Kurram from Thal, and occupied Kurram Fort on the 25th of that month. Following on from subsequent British conquests the Turis now co-operated with the British expedition against the Zaimukhts, whose hostility had been marked by the murder of Lieutenant Kinloch, and Kurram was held without further disturbance until its evacuation in October, 1880. The Turis throughout furnished supplies, their levies were employed in escorting convoys, and they, with the Bangash, petitioned that the British should take over the valley and free them from Afghan rule; but the British elected to evacuate the country and the tribe was declared independent.

Internal feuds broke out in a few months, and throughout 1882-4 the Turis were constantly fighting among themselves, as well as with the Jajis and Zaimukhts. The administration of the valley was finally undertaken by the British Government, at the request of the Turis themselves, in 1892.

Although their early dealings with the British government were inclined to turbulence, and they were involved in the Miranzai expeditions of 1851 and 1855, the only expedition specially sent against them was the Kurram expedition of 1856. After this they settled down and engaged in trade. During the Second Afghan War they supplied Sir Frederick Roberts with guides and provisions. In 1892 they voluntarily accepted British administration and furnished a large part of the tribal militia in the Kurram Valley.

Conflict with jihadists and neighboring tribes
The Turi have had a long history of conflict with jihadists both from neighbouring Pashtun tribes of the Sunni sect and those of other tribes and ethnic origins who were part of Taliban. These feuds and fights usually last in heavy bloodshed and violence that continues to date 

One of the earliest recorded tribal feuds took place during 1884, Turis were constantly fighting amongst themselves as well as other tribes. In 1892, the Turis had requested the British government of the British Raj to take over administration of the Kurram valley, which the Sunni tribes did not appreciate. Kurram has always been at constant conflict and high tensions to this day.

During the Soviet–Afghan War, Sunni Mujahideen attacked the Turis. Kurram was the launching pad for Mujahideen attacks into Afghanistan and the Shias were uncooperative, preventing the Mujahideen from passing through their areas in order to fight in Afghanistan. More recently, the conflict with the Turi has extended to the Taliban and Al Qaeda and Haqqani network supporters in the area. As well as a religious aspect (the Taliban follow the Sunni sect, scornful of Shi'as), the Turi territory is strategically important to cross-border trade and raids into Afghanistan — added to which are Pashtun intertribal tensions. Major battles were fought in 2007 and fighting continues to date.

Turi Sub-tribes
The Turis have clans just like other Pashtun tribes. The 5 principal clans are  Hamza Khel, Mastu Khel, Ghondi Khel, Alizai and Duparzai. These are grouped into two main group or clans. The Hamza Khel and Mastu Khel are known as Sargullai, whereas the remaining three are called "Chardari".  Detail of each division and the area occupied by them are given below:
 Hamza Khel: They are also known as "Kuchis" because they mostly used to be nomadic. They used to migrate to Zarak-i-Kamal and Shobak during the winters. The Hamza Khel has Spinkai, Mallal, Tarakki, Jana Khel, Pari Khel, Sati Khel, Dreplari, Badi Khel, Jaji and Khashki Khel sub-divisions. The Spinkais have Jamal Khel and Adam Khel sections, whereas Tarakkis have Bailkai, Shakar Khel, Saragullai and Aka Khel sections. The Hamza Khel own lands in karman, Shalkhana, Matudai, Mianji (Currently Mali Khel), Taida, Kotkai, Malana and Gorakmor, Nasardin (Mali Khel), Kot Ragha, Serai Mela, Joeri and Tseri hills of the Jajis.
 Mastu Khel: The Mastu Khel are sub-divided into Pirzai Khel, Zakaria Khel, Hussain Khel, Haji Khel, Turka Khel, Biga Khel and Mina Khel. They live in Tezana, Maidanak, Menozai, Badshah, Ahmadzai, Hakim Qala, Karim Qala, Sadara, Tari Kot, Shakar Kot, Baliamin and Jalami.The tribal leader for the sect Mastukhel is Malak Hussain Jan Turi 
 Ghondi Khel: The main sub-divisions of the Gondi Khel are Ali Khel, Muhammad Khel, Adin Khel, Kamil Khel and Alam Khel. Hussain ali khan khel. The sub-sections of Muhammad Khel are Shamshai Tanai Khel and Nandar Khel. They have occupied the left bank of the Kurram river from Amalkot to Ibrahimzai in the villages of Gharbina, Pewar, Agra, Amalkot, Ramak, Wali Muhammad Qala, Walidad, Sameer, Yakubi, Topaki Charsianukalley and Ibrahimzai. Their Kurram right bank villages are Rana and Maura.
 Alizai: Their three sub-divisions are Mir Hassan, Ahmad Khel and Malik Khel. The Mir Hassan sub-sections are Muhammad Khel and Chago Khel. The main villages of the Alizais are Alizai Lower kurram, Piewar, Habib Qala, Kunj Alizai, Gambir, and Agra.
 Dapparzai: The two sub-divisions of Duparzais are known as Saro Khel and Mirdad Khel. The Saro Khel sub-sections are Daolat Khel, Jafar Khel, Sultan Khel, Shubalan Khel, Baghdadiwar and Megak. The Mirdad Khel sub-sections are Kami Khel, Dreplara, Tar Khel, Lamikot Khel and Kachikana. The Duparzais live in the villages of Paiwar, Shublan, Bughdi, Alam Sher Qala, Dangila, Shaikh Nur Qala Mathzai, Gidara, Shingak, Burki, Kharlachi and Tangi. It may be worth nothing here that these Turi villages and sub-sections existed in the early years of this century. With the increase of population, many changes have taken place in the people themselves and their settlements.

See also
 Pashtun Culture

References

" ساغری خٹک تاریخ کے آئینے میں " از نور خان خٹک بی ۔اے

Karlani Pashtun tribes
Social groups of Pakistan
Ethnic groups in Paktia Province
Shia Islam in Afghanistan
Shia Islam in Pakistan
Shia communities